is a Japanese professional tennis player.

She has won two singles and 13 doubles titles on the ITF Women's Circuit. On 22 February 2016, she reached her best singles ranking of world No. 263. On 10 April 2017, she peaked at No. 147 in the doubles rankings.

Okuno made her WTA Tour singles debut at the 2016 Taiwan Open, where she qualified for the main draw.

ITF Circuit finals

Singles: 3 (2–1)

Doubles: 29 (13–16)

References

External links
 
 

1995 births
Living people
Japanese female tennis players
Sportspeople from Osaka Prefecture
Sportspeople from Santa Clara, California
21st-century Japanese women